1974 in the Philippines details events of note that happened in the Philippines in the year 1974.

Incumbents
 President: Ferdinand Marcos (Independent)
 Chief Justice: Roberto Concepcion

Events

March
 March 11 – Japanese lieutenant Hiroo Onoda, one of the longest-remaining Japanese holdouts, formally surrendering his sword to President Marcos at Malacañang Palace after continuing to fight for 29 years in the Lubang Island.

September
 September 21 – Presidential decree No. 557 declares all barrios in the country as barangays.

Holidays

As per Act No. 2711 section 29, issued on March 10, 1917, any legal holiday of fixed date falls on Sunday, the next succeeding day shall be observed as legal holiday. Sundays are also considered legal religious holidays. Bonifacio Day was added through Philippine Legislature Act No. 2946. It was signed by then-Governor General Francis Burton Harrison in 1921. On October 28, 1931, the Act No. 3827 was approved declaring the last Sunday of August as National Heroes Day. As per Republic Act No. 3022, April 9th was proclaimed as Bataan Day. Independence Day was changed from July 4 (Philippine Republic Day) to June 12 (Philippine Independence Day) on August 4, 1964.

 January 1 – New Year's Day
 February 22 – Legal Holiday
 April 9 – Araw ng Kagitingan (Day of Valor)
 April 11 – Maundy Thursday
 April 12 – Good Friday
 May 1 – Labor Day
 June 12 – Independence Day 
 July 4 – Philippine Republic Day
 August 13  – Legal Holiday
 August 25 – National Heroes Day
 September 21 – Thanksgiving Day
 November 30 – Bonifacio Day
 December 25 – Christmas Day
 December 30 – Rizal Day

Entertainment and culture
 July 19 – Miss Universe 1974, the 23rd Miss Universe pageant, is held in Manila. Outgoing Miss Universe Margarita Moran, of the Philippines crowned the tearful pageant winner, Amparo Muñoz of Spain. It is the first time that pageant history is held in the Philippines and Southeast Asia.

Sports
 September 1–16 – The country participates in the 1974 Asian Games which is held in Tehran, Iran. It ranked 15th with no gold medals, 2 silver medals and 11 bronze medals with a total of 13 over-all medals.
 September 21–29 – The 1974 Men's World Weightlifting Championships were held in Manila.

Births

January 10 – Mansueto Velasco, olympic boxer
January 17 – Lilet, Singer, TV-host, actress, and commercial model 
January 20 – Gerard Fainsan, Former Universal Motion Dancers member, actor (d. 1997)
January 20 – Racquel Reyes
January 31 – Kenneth Duremdes, basketball player
February 6 – Aljo Bendijo, Journalist, news anchor
February 7 – Cheryl Cosim, Journalist, news anchor and TV host
February 18 – Rachel Alejandro, singer actress
February 26 – Mikee Cojuangco-Jaworski, actress, equestrian and member of the International Olympic Committee
March 17 – Paolo Bediones, Journalist and TV host
March 24 – Tado Jimenez, comedian (d. 2014)
April 5 – Sheryl Cruz, actress and singer
April 6 – Win Gatchalian, senator and businessman
May 1 – Charlene Gonzales, beauty queen and TV host
May 14 – Jennifer Sevilla, actress
May 19 – Marjorie Barretto, actress
May 27 – Arthur Acuña, actor
May 30 – Red Sternberg, actor
June 14 – Bong Go, politician
June 24 – Ruffa Gutierrez, actress and TV personality
July 10 – Richard Quan, actor and model
August 4 – Dominic Ochoa, actor
August 7 – Chuckie Dreyfus, actor
August 21 – Martin Andanar, secretary of the Presidential Communications Group
August 24 – Eric Menk, basketball player
October 24:
Isko Moreno, actor, and politician
 Pia Guanio, TV host
October 26 – Janet Arnaiz, singer, actress, and commercial model 
November 1 – Sharmaine Arnaiz, actress
November 15 – Jiggy Manicad, TV anchor and reporter
November 21 – Karla Estrada, actress, singer, and TV host
November 21 - James Salas, Jim Salas, Universal Motion Dancers member
December 5 – Donita Rose, TV actress and personality
December 11 – Lucy Torres, TV actress and personality
December 15 – Pooh, comedian
December 20 – Mahal, actress (d. 2021 )

References